Arkma is a village in Türi Parish, Järva County in northern-central Estonia.

Politician Jüri Vilms (1889–1918) was born in Arkma.

References

 

Villages in Järva County
Kreis Fellin